The 1985 All-Ireland Senior Football Championship was the 99th staging of the All-Ireland Senior Football Championship, the Gaelic Athletic Association's premier inter-county Gaelic football tournament. The championship began on 5 May 1985 and ended on 22 September 1985.

Kerry entered the championship as the defending champions. Notably, the All-Ireland final was postponed specifically because both semi-finals were drawn and required replays.

On 22 September 1985, Kerry won the championship following a 2-12 to 2-8 defeat of Dublin in the All-Ireland final. This was their 29th All-Ireland title and their second championship in succession.

Dublin's Barney Rock was the championship's top scorer with 3-28. Kerry's Jack O'Shea was the choice for Texaco Footballer of the Year.

Results

Connacht Senior Football Championship

Quarter-finals

Semi-finals

Final

Leinster Senior Football Championship

Preliminary round

 
 

Quarter-finals

 
 

Semi-finals

Final

Munster Senior Football Championship

Quarter-finals

Semi-finals

Final

Ulster Senior Football Championship

Preliminary round

Quarter-finals

 

Semi-finals

 

Final

All-Ireland Senior Football Championship

Semi-finals

 

Final

Championship statistics

Miscellaneous

 The Kerry vs Limerick game was the first meeting between the teams since 1970.
 Dublin play Laois in the Leinster final for the first time since 1963. 
 For the first time since 1955 both All Ireland semi-finals went to a replay and ended in draws the first day.

Scoring

Overall

Top scorers in a single game

References